Sonia Akula is an Indian actress who appears in Telugu language films. Sonia made her debut with the 2019 Telugu film George Reddy.

Early life 
Sonia Akula was born on 31 May in Gajulapally Village, Manthani Mandal, Peddapalli district, Telangana, India. She Completed her B.Tech. from Bhojreddy Engineering College in Hyderabad.

Career 
Akula started her career as an actress in the year 2019 with her debut film George Reddy where she played the role of Reddy's sister.In 2020 she played the role of Shanthi in Ram Gopal Varma's Telugu film Coronavirus. In 2022 she was seen in Anand Chandra's directed movie Aasha Encounter playing the lead role of Aasha.

Filmography

References

External links

Actresses in Telugu cinema
Actresses from Hyderabad, India
Living people
Indian film actresses
21st-century Indian actresses
Indian activists
Year of birth missing (living people)